Broadway is a side platformed Sacramento RT light rail station in Sacramento, California, United States, served by the Blue Line. The station was opened on September 26, 2003, and is operated by the Sacramento Regional Transit District. 
It is located south of Broadway near Freeport Boulevard, and was the initial station of the Phase 1 south side extension.  In addition, it is the southernmost station in the Central City service area (the former fare zone).

Platforms and tracks

References

Sacramento Regional Transit light rail stations
Railway stations in the United States opened in 2003
2003 establishments in California